Vyshka is the name of several rural localities in Russia:
Vyshka, Astrakhan Oblast, a selo in Rynkovsky Selsoviet of Limansky District in Astrakhan Oblast; 
Vyshka, Kirov Oblast, a village in Biserovsky Rural Okrug of Afanasyevsky District in Kirov Oblast; 
Vyshka, Nizhny Novgorod Oblast, a village in Nizhegorodsky Selsoviet of Dalnekonstantinovsky District in Nizhny Novgorod Oblast; 
Vyshka, Tver Oblast, a village in Zarechenskoye Rural Settlement of Maksatikhinsky District in Tver Oblast
Vyshka (settlement), Yaroslavl Oblast, a settlement in Pokrovo-Sitsky Rural Okrug of Breytovsky District in Yaroslavl Oblast
Vyshka (village), Yaroslavl Oblast, a village in Pokrovo-Sitsky Rural Okrug of Breytovsky District in Yaroslavl Oblast